Paracleistostoma is a genus of crabs in the family Camptandriidae. It used to be a member of Ocypodidae, but now the genus is reclassified. They are distributed in Singapore, west coast of Malay peninsula and Hainan, Fujian provinces in Mainland China. They are found in seawater or mud area in brink water.

Species
Paracleistostoma crassipilum Dai, Yang, Song & Chen, 1986
Paracleistostoma depressum de Man, 1895
Paracleistostoma eriophorum Nobili, 1903
Paracleistostoma fossulum Barnard, 1955
Paracleistostoma japonicum Sakai, 1934
Paracleistostoma laciniatum Rahayu & Ng, 2003
Paracleistostoma longimanum Tweedie, 1937
Paracleistostoma quadratum Rahayu & Ng, 2003
Paracleistostoma tomentosum Yang & Sun, 1993
Paracleistostoma wardi (Rathbun, 1926)

References 

Ocypodoidea
Taxa named by Johannes Govertus de Man